The Journal of Petrology is a monthly peer-reviewed academic journal focused on the field of igneous and metamorphic petrology and petrogenesis. The journal is published by the Oxford University Press and indexed in the Science Citation Index. The editor-in-chief is Georg Zellmer (Massey University).

Abstracting and indexing

The journal is abstracted and indexed in:
Aquatic Sciences and Fisheries Abstracts
Chemical Abstracts
CAB Abstracts
Current Contents/Physical, Chemical and Earth Sciences
GEOBASE
ProQuest databases
Science Citation Index
According to the Journal Citation Reports, the journal has a 2020 impact factor of 4.515.

References

External links

English-language journals
1960 establishments in the United Kingdom
Publications established in 1960
Geology journals
Oxford University Press academic journals
Monthly journals